Francisco Fierro Palas, called "Pancho" Fierro (c. 1807/1809, Lima – 28 July 1879, Lima) was a Peruvian painter, known primarily for his costumbrista watercolors, which depict his country's life and customs.

Biography 
He was baptized on 5 February 1809, the son of Nicolás Rodríguez del Fierro, a priest, and a slave from the household of Nicolás' father, Don Antonio, a Colonel in the Militia Battalion. He had been manumitted upon his birth, following a rule that said no son of a Spaniard could be born a slave, but was raised by his mother's family.

There is no record of him receiving any artistic training, so he was probably self-taught. He married in 1828 and made his living by painting signs, making posters for bullfights and molding statues for nativity scenes. He also painted wall murals, all of which have been destroyed or covered over.

Today, he is remembered for his watercolors, painted on sign cards, depicting everyday scenes from Peruvian life. He created over 1200 of them and their popularity produced many imitators. The writer Ricardo Palma owned a large collection which his heirs gave to the City of Lima. They are now on display at the Pinacoteca Municipal Ignacio Merino.  The captions were provided by Palma, as Fierro may have been illiterate. Other large collections were acquired by the French painter Léonce Angrand and the Russian ethnographer Leopold von Schrenck, whose collection is now at the "Museum of Anthropology and Ethnography" in the Kunstkamera, Saint Petersburg. He also painted Juan Jose Cabezudo, a gay chef from Lima.

According to an obituary in El Comercio, he died of paralysis in a hospital on Peruvian Independence Day.

Selected watercolors

Further reading 

 
  Gustavo León y León Durán: Apuntes histórico genealógicos de Francisco Fierro: Pancho Fierro. Biblioteca Nacional del Perú, Fondo Editorial, Lima, 2004. .
 Manuel Cisneros Sánchez: Pancho Fierro y la Lima del 800, Importadora, Exportadora y Librería García Ribeyro, 1975 
 Marta Garsd, "Francisco Fierro" in Encyclopedia of Latin American History and Culture, vol. 2, p. 564. New York: Charles Scribner's Sons 1996.
 Raúl Porras Barrenechea and Jaime Bayly: Pancho Fierro, Ediciones del Instituto de Arte Contemporáneo, 1959
 José Sabogal Diéguez: Pancho Fierro: estampas del pintor peruano, Editorial Nova, 1945

References

External links 

 More watercolors @ the Biblioteca Luis Ángel Arango
 Video Documentary: "Vida y Obras de Pancho Fierro" (narration in Spanish) Part I, Part II, Part III

Peruvian people of indigenous peoples descent
Peruvian people of Spanish descent
1800s births
1879 deaths
People from Lima
Peruvian watercolourists
19th-century Peruvian painters
19th-century Peruvian male artists
Peruvian male painters